Gail Gutsche is an American activist and Democratic Party state politician in Montana. She is a candidate for the elected position of member for District 4 of the Montana Public Service Commission, a regulatory tribunal that regulates public utilities in the state.

She served four terms in the Montana House of Representatives and one term (2008–2012) as a member (commissioner) of the Montana Public Service Commission. She is executive director of the Montana Organizing Project, an advocacy group based in Missoula, Montana.

References

Living people
Members of the Montana House of Representatives
Women state legislators in Montana
Year of birth missing (living people)
21st-century American women